The Southern Book Club's Guide to Slaying Vampires is a 2020 horror novel by American author Grady Hendrix. It was first published on April 7, 2020 through Quirk Books and centers upon a women's book club that faces a vampiric threat.

Synopsis
Bored and neglected, 90's Southern suburban housewife Patricia Campbell has little in her life that truly brings her joy. Her days are filled with caring for a senile mother-in-law named Miss Mary, a doctor husband, Carter, who spends much of his time working, and two teenage children, Korey and Carter Jr. aka "Blue," who are growing up and distracted by their own interests. 

Patricia's sole escape is her book club, which has recently splintered into a new group that focuses on true crime. The group includes Grace Cavanaugh, Kitty Scruggs, Slick Paley, and Maryellen. The book club is a chance for these women to escape their domesticity and talk about things other than their husbands and children. However, everything changes when Patricia is attacked by an elderly neighbor named Ann Savage. Following the attack, Patricia meets Ann's nephew, James Harris. James seems dashing and is good at investments, but he harbors a little secret. He's a vampire. 

Patricia's suspicions about James are confirmed by Ursula Greene, a woman who had previously worked for the Campbell family. Mrs. Greene tells Patricia that James's white van was seen in her neighborhood, and ever since, black children in the area have gone missing, or are killing themselves in horrific ways. It starts with 8-year-old Orville Reed and his cousin, Sam, and Mrs. Greene is fearful that the disappearances will continue. So when 9-year-old Destiny Taylor starts showing odd behavior, Patricia wants to get involved and try to stop James before it's too late.

The police refuse to take the disappearances seriously, and even worse, Carter and Patricia's book club don't believe her at first. As strange disturbances continue, the book club eventually has no choice but to get involved. As a result, they discover not only supernatural evil but also the systematic racism and "misogyny, rage, anger, and the indignities that women had to endure in order to survive, to be respectable, to be considered proper women."

Development
When developing the book Hendrix chose to set it in his childhood home town of Charleston and drew upon some of his personal experiences. His own grandmother had dementia, which frightened Hendrix as a child, as he remembered her "as a monster, and that's not her fault, it was a disease none of us understood." He thus created the character of Mrs. Mary, Patricia's mother-in-law, to "give her the hero moment she deserved, the one Alzheimer's robbed her of at the end of her life." Hendrix also chose to explore the relationships between white and black women in the South during the 1990s, as the lives of the two groups were interconnected. He had the vampire prey upon black children and adults as the vampire "assumes that the children of working class African American parents aren't valued. He doesn't look deeper and realize that in a lot of ways, at our best, moms care about kids no matter whose they are."

Publication history 
The Southern Book Club's Guide to Slaying Vampires was first published in hardback and ebook format on April 7, 2020 through Quirk Books. It was accompanied by an audiobook adaptation narrated by Bahni Turpin and published by Blackstone Publishing.

Reception
Tor.com stated that The Southern Book Club's Guide to Slaying Vampires was "a brutal book", whose "happy ending comes at a high cost." The AV Club's AUX also reviewed the work, comparing it to "its undead antagonist: flashy and engaging in the action, but strangely hollow at its heart."

Television series 
Television rights to The Southern Book Club's Guide to Slaying Vampires were optioned prior to the book's publication by Patrick Moran's PMK Productions. Hendrix and Brett Cohen will serve as executive producers.

References

External links
 

2020s horror novels
Books by Grady Hendrix
Quirk Books books